Alessandro Boccolini (born July 14, 1984) is an Italian football (soccer) goalkeeper.

He moved to Ascoli for the 2005-06 season, having previously being signed with Alessandria and Viterbese. He left the club in June 2007, after three appearances in two Serie A campaigns (one in 2005–06, two in 2006–07) as Ascoli's backup goalkeeper, and was announced by Serie C2 side Ivrea in September 2007 in a free transfer. He was then sold to F.C. Canavese, another Serie C2 team, during the January 2008 transfer window.

References

External links
Boccolini's playing profile (Gazzetta.it, updated to the 2006–07 season)

1984 births
Living people
Italian footballers
U.S. Alessandria Calcio 1912 players
Ascoli Calcio 1898 F.C. players
Serie A players
Association football goalkeepers
Footballers from Rome
A.S.D. Calcio Ivrea players
A.S.D. Civitavecchia 1920 players